The XVIII Racquetball European Championships were held in Hamburg, (Germany) from June 24–27, 2015, with only 3 countries represented. The EURO 2015 were under the patronage of the city of Hamburg.

The venue was the Sport Department, in Hamburg, with 3 regulation racquetball courts. In addition to the European Championships, the European Racquetball Masters and Junior Racquetball Championships were held at the same time.

The opening ceremony was on June 24 with the president of European Racquetball Federation, Mike Mesecke, and the president of German Racquetball Federation, Jörg Ludwig.

Men's Singles Competition

Ladies Singles Competition

Men's Doubles Competition

Ladies Doubles Competition

See also
European Racquetball Championships

External links
Men's singles results
Ladies singles results
Andrea Gordon and Oliver Bertels are European Champions ERF Website

European Racquetball Championships
Racquetball
Racquetball in Germany
Sports competitions in Hamburg
International sports competitions hosted by Germany
2015 in German sport